Daughter of the Peaks is a 1914 Swedish silent drama film directed by Victor Sjöström.

Cast
 Greta Almroth as Waina
 Lili Bech as Nurse
 John Ekman as Nordman
 Arvid Englind as Werner's Friend
 William Larsson as Werner's Friend
 Victor Sjöström as Doctor Karl Werner
 Jenny Tschernichin-Larsson as Wener's Mother

References

External links

1914 films
1910s Swedish-language films
Swedish black-and-white films
1914 drama films
Swedish silent short films
Films directed by Victor Sjöström
1914 short films
Swedish drama films
Silent drama films